The men's 109 kilograms competition at the 2022 World Weightlifting Championships was held on 15 December 2022.

Schedule

Medalists

Records

Results

References

Men's 109 kg